Thai pop or T-pop, is a genre of Thai music roughly equivalent to western pop. It emerged in the 1970s–80s, during which it was known as string music, before gaining mainstream popularity during the 1990s and has since dominated the Thai music industry. The term is extremely broad, covering Thai rock, dance music, rap and western-influenced popular music in general, though normally excluding the folk and rock-influenced phleng phuea chiwit.

The origins of string lie in American R&B, surf-rock artists like The Ventures and Dick Dale, Exotica, rockabilly and country and western brought to Thailand by American and Australian soldiers serving in Vietnam in the late 1950s and early 1960s. It also drew heavily on genres from the British Invasion, including rock and roll, garage rock and Hollywood film soundtracks. Since the 1980s, it has mixed with other genres, such as disco, funk and dance.

T-Wind
T-Wind (Thai Wind) is a term used to describe the phenomenon of Thai pop culture in the international. It is a term created to compare Korean Wave. In the period since 2000, Thailand has been exporting many kinds of cultural products to many countries, especially in Southeast Asia, such as lakhon (television drama), movies and BL series from GMMTV – GDH and lukkwad-pop (Thai teen pop).

See also
List of Thai pop artists
Music of Thailand
Thai rock
Thai hip hop

References

Thai popular music
Thai styles of music
Pop music by country
Pop music genres